Sikh Chola is traditional dress worn by Sikhs. It is a martial attire which gives freedom of movement to a Sikh warrior. Sikh Chola is also unisex attire, and may also be decorated with heavy embroidery all over it or on the chest.

There are preserved chola relics and artefacts that were worn by the Sikh Gurus. A particular Khilka-type Chola believed to have belonged to Guru Nanak has garnered considerable attention and study. A preserved chola of Guru Hargobind linked to the tale of his release from Gwalior Fort with fifty-two fellow prisoners is believed to be preserved at Ghudani Kalan village in Amritsar district of Punjab, India.

Gallery

See also 

 Sikh art and culture
 Dastar

References 

Indian clothing
Sikh culture